Mean What You Say may refer to:

 Mean What You Say (Philly Joe Jones album)
 Mean What You Say (Thad Jones/Pepper Adams Quintet album)
 Mean What You Say (Witness album)
 Mean What You Say (Sent by Ravens album)